Estadio Padre Ernesto Martearena is a stadium located in Salta, Argentina. The stadium, built for the 2001 FIFA World Youth Championship, holds 20,408 people and was opened in January 2001. It is now the home ground of football clubs Juventud Antoniana and Central Norte, both playing currently in the country's third level.

While it is mainly used for association football, the Argentina national rugby union team has also played at Padre Martearena stadium. The structure is formed by four sectors, two sides tiers with capacity for 6,000 each one, and two main grandstands with 4,000. They are also formed by 22 modules of 900 spectators each.

The stadium was named after Father Ernesto Martearena (1944–2001), a priest that served in the province and was recognised for his social work. Martearena was killed after being assaulted by two men in his own house.

Football

FIFA Youth World Cup 
During the 2001 FIFA World Youth Championship this stadium hosted the Group E, conformed by Netherlands, Costa Rica, Ecuador and Ethiopia, and the round of 16 match between Costa Rica and Czech Republic.

Copa América 
It also hosted two Group B matches for the 2011 Copa America:

Other football events 
The stadium hosted for the first time an international club competition when Boca Juniors played its home matches for the round of 16 and quarter finals of the 2004 Copa Sudamericana. For the 2005 and 2006 editions of the cup, Boca Juniors used this stadium only for the round of 16 home matches.

Since 2002 Salta hosts one of the many annual Summer Tournaments and has hosted several matches for the Copa Argentina on its 2011–12, 2013–14 and 2014–15 editions.

Rugby

Argentina 
Argentina national rugby union team, Los Pumas, has played several test matches here and several Rugby Championship matches.

Shows
Some of the artists that have performed at the Padre Martearena Stadium are Indio Solari (2009 and 2011), Wisin & Yandel (2010), Calle 13 (2011), Shakira (2011), Ricardo Arjona (2014), Violetta (2015) and Ricky Martin (2016).

References

pa
p
p
p
Buildings and structures in Salta Province
Sport in Salta Province
Sports venues completed in 2001